Aiton is a commune in the Savoie department in the Auvergne-Rhône-Alpes region in south-eastern France.

Geography
Aiton stands at the crossroads of the Maurienne and Tarentaise valleys, marking the transition between the foothills of the Combe de Savoie and the Alps proper. The Arc and Isère rivers have their confluence just downstream from Aiton, at the Pont Royal.

Population

Economy
Aiton hosts the French loading platform for the Alpine rolling highway running under the Mont Cenis Tunnel to Orbassano near Turin.

It is also home to a prison, opened in July 1992 after serving as press accommodation for the 1992 Winter Olympics.

See also
Communes of the Savoie department

References

Communes of Savoie